Frederick John Behre  (December 21, 1863 – March 10, 1942) was an American artist born in San Francisco, California.

Behre spent some years working for Hubert Howe Bancroft in Berkeley, California as an artist-designer. By 1888 he had established himself as an active member in the local art scene in Pasadena, where he helped found the Artists League of Southern California in 1893. Behre worked mostly in oils and painted still lifes. He died in 1942 in Los Angeles.

References
 

1863 births
1942 deaths
American illustrators
Spanish missions in California